Parc de Sceaux is one of the Paris RER B stations, located in the city of Antony. This is also the name of a park and castle from Jean-Baptiste Colbert.

References

See also

 List of stations of the Paris RER

Réseau Express Régional stations in Hauts-de-Seine
Railway stations in France opened in 1854